José Cascante, José de Cascante or Joseph Cascante (1646 – December 1702) was a Colombian Baroque composer and organist. Born in Bogotá, he was the maestro de capilla of that city's cathedral for many years, until his death, and oversaw the installation of its organ.  His output consisted of villancicos; his work was important for native Americans and immigrants to develop popular genres later in history, such as the bambuco, the torbellino, the guabina, the pasillo, the danza, and the contradanza, among others.

References
Biographical information

Colombian composers
Colombian organists
Colombian Baroque composers
People from Bogotá
1646 births
1702 deaths
18th-century keyboardists
Male classical composers
Male organists